Marlene Zarader, born in 1949, is a French philosopher. She teaches philosophy at the Paul Valéry University, Montpellier III in Montpellier. Since became a member of the Institut Universitaire de France in 2007.
Her book The Unthought Debt was originally published in French in 1990. The work was translated to English by Bettina Bergo.

Publications
 Heidegger et les paroles de l'origine, 1986
 La dette impensée. Heidegger et l'héritage hébraïque, 1990. Translated to English by Bettina Bergo (Stanford University Press, 2006).
 L'Être et le neutre. A partir de Maurice Blanchot, 2001 
 La patience de Némésis, 2009

Participations to others publications in English
 « Phenomenality and transcendence », in : Transcendence in philosophy and religion, J. E. Faulconer, Indiana University Press, 2002, p. 106-120. 
 « The mirror with the triple reflection », in : Christopher Macann (ed.) : Martin Heidegger : Critical Assessments [4 volumes], Routledge ed., London and New-York, 1992, vol. II, p. 17-36. Reissue in : Critical Heidegger, Routledge ed., London and New-York, 1996, p. 7-27.

Sources
 review of The Unthought Debt

1949 births
Living people
French philosophers